Paramaledivibacter caminithermalis is a species of bacteria in the family Peptostreptococcaceae. Clostridium caminithermale has been reclassified to Paramaledivibacter caminithermalis. Paramaledivibacter caminithermalis has been isolated from a deep-sea hydrothermal vent from the Atlantic Ocean Ridge.

References

Peptostreptococcaceae
Bacteria described in 2003